Mentari may refer to:

 PT Lion Mentari Airlines, the owner of Lion Air
 Thai Lion Air, a Lion Air subsidiary (Callsign: MENTARI)
 Mentari Toys (also Mentari Massen Toys), a toy manufacturer from Mentari Group
 Mentari International School, an international school in Jakarta, Indonesia
Mentari, a wireless services sub-brand of Indosat Ooredoo, a telecommunications provider in Indonesia.
 Mentari BRT station, a bus rapid transit station in Bandar Sunway, Malaysia
 Pitha Haningtyas Mentari, an Indonesian badminton player